The Shannon number, named after the American mathematician Claude Shannon, is a conservative lower bound of the game-tree complexity of chess of 10120, based on an average of about 103 possibilities for a pair of moves consisting of a move for White followed by a move for Black, and a typical game lasting about 40 such pairs of moves.

Shannon's calculation 

Shannon showed a calculation for the lower bound of the game-tree complexity of chess, resulting in about 10120 possible games, to demonstrate the impracticality of solving chess by brute force, in his 1950 paper "Programming a Computer for Playing Chess". (This influential paper introduced the field of computer chess.)

This includes some illegal positions (e.g., pawns on the first rank, both kings in check) and excludes legal positions following captures and promotions.
							

After each player has moved a piece 5 times each (10 ply) there are 69,352,859,712,417 possible games that could have been played.

Tighter bounds

Upper 
Taking Shannon's numbers into account, Victor Allis calculated an upper bound of 5×1052 for the number of positions, and estimated the true number to be about 1050. Recent results improve that estimate, by proving an upper bound of 8.7x1045, and showing an upper bound 4×1037 in the absence of promotions.

Lower 
Allis also estimated the game-tree complexity to be at least 10123, "based on an average branching factor of 35 and an average game length of 80". As a comparison, the number of atoms in the observable universe, to which it is often compared, is roughly estimated to be 1080.

Accurate estimates 

Number of sensible chess games 
As a comparison to the Shannon number, if chess is analyzed for the number of "sensible" games that can be played (not counting ridiculous or obvious game-losing moves such as moving a queen to be immediately captured by a pawn without compensation), then the result is closer to around 1040 games. This is based on having a choice of about three sensible moves at each ply (half-move), and a game length of 80 plies (or, equivalently, 40 moves).

See also 

 Solving chess
 Go and mathematics
 Game complexity
 Combinatorial explosion

Notes and references

External links 
 Mathematics and chess

Mathematical chess problems
Large integers
Combinatorial game theory
Computer chess
Claude Shannon